The Big Central Football Conference is a football-only athletic league of high schools in Central New Jersey. The 60-team league was formed in 2020.

History
The Big Central consists of the members of the former Mid-State 38 Conference and the football programs from the Greater Middlesex Conference, including public and private high school football teams in Hunterdon, Middlesex, Somerset, Union and Warren counties.

Divisions
For the 2021 season, there are a total of ten divisions of the Big Central Football Conference, with teams divided by size and location;

Division 1A
 David Brearley High School
 Bound Brook High School
 Middlesex High School
 New Providence High School
 Roselle Park High School

Division 1B
 Belvidere High School
 Jonathan Dayton High School
 Dunellen High School
 Highland Park High School
 Manville High School
 South Hunterdon Regional High School

Division 2A
 Bernards High School
 Hillside High School
 Delaware Valley High School
 Governor Livingston High School
 North Plainfield High School
 Voorhees High School

Division 2B
 Abraham Clark High School
 St. Thomas Aquinas High School
 Arthur L. Johnson High School
 Metuchen High School
 South River High School
 Spotswood High School

Division 3
 Carteret High School
 Rahway High School
 Somerville High School
 South Plainfield High School
 Summit High School
 Warren Hills Regional High School

Division 4
 Colonia High School
 Cranford High School
 John F. Kennedy Memorial High School
 Linden High School
 Montgomery High School
 North Hunterdon High School
 Scotch Plains-Fanwood High School
 Woodbridge High School

Division 5A
 Elizabeth High School
 Plainfield High School
 Union High School
 Watchung Hills Regional High School
 Westfield High School

Division 5B
 Bridgewater-Raritan High School
 Hunterdon Central Regional High School
 Franklin High School
 Hillsborough High School
 Phillipsburg High School
 Ridge High School

Division 5C
 East Brunswick High School
 Monroe Township High School
 Old Bridge High School
 Perth Amboy High School
 South Brunswick High School
 J. P. Stevens High School

Division 5D
 Edison High School
 New Brunswick High School
 North Brunswick Township High School
 Piscataway High School
 Sayreville War Memorial High School
 St. Joseph High School

References

2020 establishments in New Jersey
New Jersey high school athletic conferences
American football in New Jersey
High school football in the United States